This is a list of the 2014 Super League season results. Super League is the top-flight rugby league competition in the United Kingdom and France. The 2014 season starts on 7 February and ends on 11 October with the 2014 Super League Grand Final at Old Trafford. The Magic Weekend is scheduled over the weekend of 17 and 18 May and will be played at the Etihad Stadium in Manchester for the third consecutive year, having been used for the 2012 and 2013 seasons.

The 2014 Super League season consisted of two stages. The regular season was played over 27 round-robin fixtures, in which each of the fourteen teams involved in the competition played each other once at home and once away, as well as their Magic Weekend fixtures played over the sixteenth round of the season. In Super League XVIII, a win was worth two points in the table, a draw worth one point apiece, and a loss yielded no points.

The league leaders at the end of the regular season, will receive the League Leaders' Shield, but the Championship will be decided through the second stage of the season—the play-offs. The top eight teams in the table contest to play in the 2014 Super League Grand Final, the winners of which will be crowned Super League XIX Champions.

Regular season
(References next to the scores=Video Highlights) (Match Stats are shown at the conclusion of each video)

Round 1

The round-one fixture at the DW Stadium was brought back a week to enable the Warriors to fly down under to prepare for their World Club Challenge match.
The Warrington Wolves began their tenth season at the Halliwell Jones Stadium
11,526 is the biggest ever attendance at the KC Lightstream Stadium.
Castleford's Kirk Dixon scored his 1000th career  point

Round 2

Round 3

The Castleford Tigers made history with their first away win over Hull KR in the Super League era.

Here are February's top 5 tries:

Round 4

 Leeds' draw ended a five match losing streak against Huddersfield.
 Castleford beat Wigan at home for the first time in eight years.

Round 5

Wigan won their 13th consecutive game against Hull KR.
Huddersfield mercilessly exposed Bradford’s depleted resources with a Super League record 66-18 victory at the Provident Stadium.

Round 6

Round 7

 Kevin Sinfield scored his 3500th point for the Leeds Rhinos.
 Warrington came from 14-4 down at half-time to ease to a 10th consecutive win over Huddersfield.

Here are March's top 5 tries:

Round 8

St Helens' Paul Wellens scored his 1000th point of his career.

Round 9 - Easter Matches

17,980 is the highest attendance to watch a game at Langtree Park.
Coming into this round St Helens were the only unbeaten team in the comp. Their unbeaten run came to an end with a defeat to the defending champions the Wigan Warriors. All teams have now lost at least once in the competition, but the London Broncos are the only team yet to win a game at this stage of the season.
Rob Burrow made his 400th appearance for Leeds.
Brett Kearney made his 100th appearance for Bradford.
Hull KR's Craig Hall kicked the winning point, 46 seconds from time, to secure a win against his former club (Hull F.C.) in the 221st Humber Derby.
The Catalans Dragons have now beaten the Broncos 10 times consecutively.

Round 10

Here are April's top 5 tries:

Round 11

St. Helens won their 11th consecutive game against the Londoners
Zak Hardaker scored his 50th try for Leeds
Bradford ended a 10-game losing streak against Warrington.
Jermaine McGillvary made his 100th appearance for Huddersfield
Danny Brough scored his 1000th point for Huddersfield
Hull F.C. lead 16-0 after 52 minutes but then Wakefield Trinity replied with 23 unanswered points to stun the home team.
Wakefield's Danny Washbrook made his 200th career appearance.

Round 12

Leeds' Ryan Bailey made his 300th appearance for the Rhinos.
Warringtons' Joel Monaghan made his 100th appearance for the Wolves. He also scored his 100th try for his club in the same match.
Wakefield Trinity have now beaten Widnes for 7 consecutive games. Widnes' last win against the Wildcats was back in 2005.

Round 13 - Magic Weekend 

36,399 is the biggest attendance figure for a Magic Weekend day.
London have now lost 11 consecutive matches against the Catalans Dragons.
Catalans' Vincent Duport made his 100th Super League appearance.
The Widnes Vikings won their first ever Magic Weekend fixture.
Hull Kingston Rovers have now beaten their rivals in 5 of their previous 6 Magic Weekend meetings.
Hull F.C.'s Jason Crookes was the first player this season to be sent off! He was sent off the pitch following a dangerous high tackle on Hull Kingston Rovers center Liam Salter.
Wigan's Michael McIlorum made his 150th Super League appearance.
Watch this insane fight which resulted in '3 Yellow Cards' (Leeds vs. Wigan)
Bradford have now lost 7 out of their 8 Magic Weekend fixtures.
Warrington have now won 6 out of their 8 Magic Weekend fixtures.
64,552 is the biggest attendance figure for a Magic Weekend. The previous record was back in 2012 when a figure of 63,716 fans turned up to watch the matches at the Super League showcase weekend.

Round 14

Huddersfield's Brett Ferres made his 200th Super League appearance.
Warrington have now beaten Wakefield Trinity 9 consecutive times with 5 of those wins coming at The Rapid Solicitors Stadium (Wakefield's home ground).
Widnes' Kevin Brown made his 250th career appearance

Round 15

Leeds' Kylie Leuluai made his 200th Super League appearance.
Warrington's Chris Bridge scored his 1000th career point. He also brought up another milestone as he scored his 100th try for his club.
Wakefield Trinity have now failed to win any of their past seven matches at the Provident Stadium (Bradford's home ground).
Castleford's Luke Dorn scored his 150th try in the British game.

Here are May's top 5 tries:

Round 16

Leeds have now failed to beat Huddersfield in 8 consecutive meetings. This was also Leeds' first home defeat of the season.
Catalans Dragons' Thomas Bosc scored his 1,000th super league point in his team's win over St. Helens.

Catchup game: Wigan vs Widnes

This game was scheduled to play in Round 2, but due to Wigan's participation in the 2014 World Club Challenge, it has been shifted to this date.

Round 17

Huddersfield have now beaten London for 15 consecutive matches. The last time the Londoners beat Huddersfield was back in 2008.
St Helens' Jon Wilkin made his 300th appearance for the "Red V".
Wakefield Trinity beat Wigan for the first time since 2009.

Round 18

Leeds' Jamie Peacock made his 400th Super League appearance.
Here are June's top 5 tries:

Round 19

Catalans' Vincent Duport made his 150th career appearance.
2007 was the last time St. Helens beat Hull Kingston Rovers at the KC Lightstream Stadium.

Round 20

The last time Widnes beat Wakefield Trinity was back in 2005.
London still haven't won a match this season and their defeat against Warrington has now made it mathematically impossible to avoid relegation.

Round 21

Wigan's Josh Charnley made his 100th Super League appearance
Bradford's defeat against Huddersfield has now made it mathematically impossible to remain in the Super League next season. This is the first time, in 40 years, that Bradford will not be playing in England's top rugby league competition.
Kevin Sinfield received his one and only red card for headbutting Luke Dorn.

Round 22

Hudderfield's Jermaine McGillvary scored his 100th career try in his team's 38-16 win.
The Catalans Dragons defeat against the Giants means that they haven't won at the John Smith's Stadium since 2009.
Wakefield's 40-26 victory was their first win over Warrington in 10 attempts.

Round 23

Here are July's top 5 tries:

Round 24

Ian Henderson made his 100th appearance for the Catalans Dragons.
Catalans' Thomas Bosc kicked his 500th goal for the French club.
Bradford's Jamie Foster scored his 1000th career point in his team's win over Hull FC.
The Broncos' win over Leeds now means that every team in the competition has won at least once.

Round 25

The Saints win over the Rhinos has now made them guaranteed winners of the 2014 Super League's League Leaders' Shield for the first time since 2008.
Here are August's top 5 tries:

Round 26

Round 27

Wigan's win over Warrington was their first victory against the Wolves, at the DW Stadium, in 5 years.
Hull FC's Richard Horne made his final career appearance. He finished his career that spanned 16 years and produced 387 appearances all for the Black and Whites.  
Leeds' Ryan Hall scored his 200th career try in his team's defeat against Hull FC.
Had Castleford won the League Leaders' Shield, it would be the first time that they finished on top of the table at season's end in 88 years.

Progression Table
Teams are listed in order of where they finished on the table
Numbers highlighted in green indicate that the team finished the round inside the top 8
Numbers highlighted in blue indicates the team finished first on the ladder in that round
Numbers highlighted in red indicates the team finished last place on the ladder in that round
Underlined numbers indicate that the team had a bye during that round (*2=Wigan vs. Widnes catchup game)

End of Regular Season Table

* - Bradford Bulls deducted 6 points on 25 February 2014 for entering administration

St Helens won their fifth League Leaders' Shield

Play-offs
The 2014 Super League play-offs took place during September and October 2014 and consisted of the top eight teams of the regular season.

Format

Super League has used a play-off system since Super League III in 1998. When introduced, 5 teams qualified for the play-offs, which was subsequently expanded to 6 teams in 2002. The 2014 season will follow the same format that has been used since the 2009 season, which consists of an 8-team play-off.

The winning team from week one with the highest league placing will be allowed to select their opponents for week three in the Club Call.
Except for the Club-Call, the current play-off format follows the play-off system of the Australian Football League.

Week 1

Week 2

Week 3

Week 4

Notes

 A. Game rescheduled due to Wigan's involvement in the 2014 World Club Challenge.
 B. The 2014 Magic Weekend set record breaking numbers, making it the most successful Super League Magic Weekend ever.
 C. It is believed the Day 1 Magic Weekend figure of 36,399 would have been bigger if it weren't for the FA Cup Final being played on the same day. The Humber Derby fixture between Hull Kingston Rovers and Hull F.C. is the hottest ticket in the city of Hull, but due to Hull City being in action in the biggest football cup final in England, the attendance figure was lower than it could have been.,.
 D.The total attendance of 64,552 is the biggest ever attendance for the Magic Weekend event.,.
 E.Bradford Bulls were deducted 6 points on 25 February 2014 (end of round 2) for entering administration.
 F.St Helens opt to play against the Dragons courtesy of the club call.

See also
Super League XIX
Super League play-offs

References

External links
Super League website
Rugby League Project

Results